Internes Can't Take Money is a 1937 American drama film directed by Alfred Santell and starring Barbara Stanwyck, Joel McCrea, Lloyd Nolan and Stanley Ridges. McCrea portrays Dr. Kildare in the character's first screen appearance. Metro-Goldwyn-Mayer continued the Dr. Kildare series with Young Dr. Kildare (1938) starring Lew Ayres as Kildare and Laraine Day as a nurse in love with Kildare. The film was released in the United Kingdom as You Can't Take Money.

Plot
Dr. Kildare helps young female ex-convict Janet Haley locate her child.

Cast
 Barbara Stanwyck as Janet Haley
 Joel McCrea as Dr. Kildare
 Lloyd Nolan as Hanlon
 Stanley Ridges as Dan Innes
 Lee Bowman as Jim Weeks
 Barry Macollum as Stooly Martin
 Irving Bacon as Jeff McGuire
 Steve Pendleton as Dr. Jones (billed as Gaylord Pendleton)
 Pierre Watkin as Dr. Henry J. Fearson
 Charles Lane as Grote
 Ellen Drew as Nurse (uncredited)

Reception 
In a contemporary review for The New York Times, critic John T. McManus called the film "[a] nicely performed, well ordered and fairly rational reshuffle of the cinema verities (the chief of which are love, frustration, pathos, suspense, action and ambrosia)" and praised the lead actors: "Miss Stanwyck's work is pleasantly subdued, in contrast to the stormy time she has had in her last picture or so. Joel McCrea, as far as this reviewer is concerned, can do no wrong."

References

External links
 
 

1937 films
American black-and-white films
Films directed by Alfred Santell
Films set in hospitals
1937 drama films
Films set in New York City
American drama films
Paramount Pictures films
1930s American films